Slastukha is a village in Yekaterinovsky District of Saratov Oblast, Russia. It is the administrative center of the Slastukhinskoye Rural Settlement.

History 
The village was founded in the 18th century. By the early 2000s, it included a school and a house of culture, among other buildings. It is the center of the Yekaterinovsky Agricultural Production Cooperative.

Geography 
Slastukha is located southeast of and on the left bank of the Atkara in the southeastern part of the district,  from the district center of Yekaterinovka.

Demographics 
According to the 2010 census, its population was 650, a decrease from the 671 recorded in the 2002 census. The gender makeup of the village was 49.5% male and 50.5% female.

References

Citations

Bibliography 

 

Rural localities in Saratov Oblast
Atkarsky Uyezd